Rangana Premarathne (born 12 January 1959) is an actor in Sri Lankan cinema, theatre and television. Often rated among the best in the local drama industry, Premarathne has appeared in over 100 films and teledramas and earned numerous accolades. He is well known for his strong character and to add to that his vigorous voice.

Career
Rangana began his career as a stage drama actor in the early 1980s acting in the famous stage-drama Sajan Nallathambi which was one of the first Sri Lankan plays to be a financial success. It was hugely popular, even playing in the Middle East to Sinhala audiences.

Rangana then stepped into the teledrama industry acting in the teledrama Gamana in 1987 directed by veteran K A W Perera. His maiden cinema appearance came through the blockbuster film Gini Avi Saha Gini Keli. Doing numerous roles in different dramas he became a significant icon in the country's teledrama industry. His award-winning performance in the famous teledrama Manokaya in 1998 stands out on top of the major hits in the country's teledrama industry. In 1995, he acted in the serial Isurugira, which later represented Sri Lanka in the Golden Crest International Television Festival in Bulgaria (1995). In 1998, he won the award for Best Actor for his role in the popular television serial Manokaya.

In 2001, Rangana expanded his career as a teledrama producer. Rangana got into producing with the popular teledrama Randunu in which he also played the main role of a politician. The duo together produced six teledramas (2001–2007) which include award-winning dramas like Punchi Rala and Ruwata Ruwa. In 2002, he made triple roles in the serial Ruwata Ruwa, the first time in the Sri Lankan teledrama industry. He was later nominated at Sumathi Awards for the Best Actor as well. Again in 2017, he made the performance of another triple role (Panduka, Hapan, Bhee) in the science fiction tele series Lokantharayo.

Selected television serials

 Alu (2019)
 Anantha (2016)
 Awasan Inima (2018)
 Ayomi (2021)
 Bol Vi Ahuru (2007)
 Bopath Ella (2001)
 Dadayam Bambaru (2019)
 Damini (2001)
 Ekagei Kurullo (1996)
 Ekata Gatuma (1999)
 Gamana (1987)
 Hiru Thaniwela (2013)
 Humalaya (1992)
 Isurugira (1995)
 Kadumuna (1999)
 Kalu Hansayo (1995)
 Kinihiraka Pipi Mal (1999)
 Kutu Kutu Mama (2015)
 Lokantharayo (2017)
 Madu Nam Eya (2006)
 Maha Viru Pandu (2021)
 Makara Dadayama (2006)
 Makara Vijithaya (1999)
 Manokaya (1998)
 Maya Mansala (2004)
 Maya Sihina (2015)
 Medi Sina (2016)
 Punchi Rala (2004)
 Rajiniyo (2018)
 Ran Dalambuwo (2003)
 Randunu (2001)
 Ran Mehesi (2005)
 Rathu Pichcha (2017)
 Ridee Tharaka (2009)
 Ruwata Ruwa (2002)
 Sanda Kinduru (1999)
 Sanda Numba Nam (2010)
 Sikka Team (2016)
 Sikuru Wasanthe (2012)
 Sirakari (2017)
 Tharu Paba (2003)
 Urumayaka Aragalaya (2018)
 Uththamavi (2004)
 Uthum Pathum (2016)

Filmography

Notes

References

External links
 
 

Living people
1959 births
Sri Lankan male film actors
Sinhalese male actors
Sri Lankan male television actors
People from Kurunegala
Alumni of Maliyadeva College
Alumni of Thurstan College